NGC 172 is a barred spiral galaxy located around 136 million light-years away in the constellation Cetus. It was discovered in 1886 by astronomer Frank Muller.

See also
List of NGC objects (1–1000)

References

External links

Barred spiral galaxies
0172
Cetus (constellation)
Astronomical objects discovered in 1886
Discoveries by Frank Muller (astronomer)